Grayson Valley is an unincorporated community and census-designated place in the northeastern Birmingham area, in Jefferson County, Alabama, United States. It is located between the Spring Lake neighborhood of Birmingham, Alabama and the Birmingham suburbs of Clay, Trussville, and Center Point. At the 2020 census, the population was 5,982.

Demographics

2020 census

As of the 2020 United States census, there were 5,982 people, 2,598 households, and 1,718 families residing in the CDP.

References 

Unincorporated communities in Alabama
Census-designated places in Jefferson County, Alabama
Census-designated places in Alabama
Birmingham metropolitan area, Alabama
Unincorporated communities in Jefferson County, Alabama